Hoàng Châu Ký (xã Cẩm Kim; 1921 in Hội An, Quảng Nam – 31 January 2008, in Đà Nẵng) was a Vietnamese professor of literature and playwright. His daughter is the poet Ý Nhi. He was an academic authority on tuồng drama, in addition to setting new works such as a tuồng version of Pierre Corneille's Le Cid with Jean Claude Bourbault.

References

Vietnamese dramatists and playwrights
1921 births
2008 deaths
20th-century dramatists and playwrights